This is a partial list of molecules that contain 11 carbon atoms.

See also
 Carbon number
 List of compounds with carbon number 10
 List of compounds with carbon number 12

C11